Edendale is a town in the Southland region of New Zealand's South Island. The township is situated on the Southland Plains just to the west of the Mataura River. Before the town was called Edendale, it was known by the names Maorirua, Mataura Plains and Stuart's Bush.

History 
Edendale was originally an estate of the New Zealand and Australian Land Company, who surveyed the township and sold it in lots. The estate contained over 120,000 acres. In the course of years the company sold 80,000 acres to hundreds of farmers. The New Zealand and Australian Land Company built the first large scale dairy factory in New Zealand in 1882, and secured a bonus of £500 from the government.

The homestead of the Edendale estate was bought in 1902 by its former manager, Mr Donald Macdonald. Macdonald was instrumental in advocating the use of lime on the soils of Southland which vastly improved their quality. The Edendale Homestead is a Category I building listed by the Historic Places Trust. Built circa 1882, the homestead is approach by a mile long drive through a beautiful and mature avenue of native trees, such as totara, black and white kahikatea and matai. Descendants of Mr. Macdonald continue to own the property.

Demographics 
It is part of the wider Edendale-Woodlands statistical area.

Edendale had a population of 591 at the 2018 New Zealand census, an increase of 42 people (7.7%) since the 2013 census, and an increase of 75 people (14.5%) since the 2006 census. There were 243 households. There were 312 males and 276 females, giving a sex ratio of 1.13 males per female, with 126 people (21.3%) aged under 15 years, 84 (14.2%) aged 15 to 29, 288 (48.7%) aged 30 to 64, and 90 (15.2%) aged 65 or older.

Ethnicities were 91.9% European/Pākehā, 13.7% Māori, 2.5% Pacific peoples, 2.5% Asian, and 1.0% other ethnicities (totals add to more than 100% since people could identify with multiple ethnicities).

Although some people objected to giving their religion, 49.2% had no religion, 43.7% were Christian and 0.0% had other religions.

Of those at least 15 years old, 48 (10.3%) people had a bachelor or higher degree, and 126 (27.1%) people had no formal qualifications. The employment status of those at least 15 was that 258 (55.5%) people were employed full-time, 72 (15.5%) were part-time, and 12 (2.6%) were unemployed.

Edendale-Woodlands

Edendale-Woodlands had a population of 2,262 at the 2018 New Zealand census, an increase of 69 people (3.1%) since the 2013 census, and an increase of 132 people (6.2%) since the 2006 census. There were 864 households. There were 1,218 males and 1,044 females, giving a sex ratio of 1.17 males per female. The median age was 36.5 years (compared with 37.4 years nationally), with 519 people (22.9%) aged under 15 years, 387 (17.1%) aged 15 to 29, 1,098 (48.5%) aged 30 to 64, and 264 (11.7%) aged 65 or older.

Ethnicities were 86.2% European/Pākehā, 10.3% Māori, 1.6% Pacific peoples, 8.6% Asian, and 1.7% other ethnicities (totals add to more than 100% since people could identify with multiple ethnicities).

The proportion of people born overseas was 14.5%, compared with 27.1% nationally.

Although some people objected to giving their religion, 46.7% had no religion, 44.7% were Christian, 0.1% were Buddhist and 1.9% had other religions.

Of those at least 15 years old, 237 (13.6%) people had a bachelor or higher degree, and 375 (21.5%) people had no formal qualifications. The median income was $41,500, compared with $31,800 nationally. 327 people (18.8%) earned over $70,000 compared to 17.2% nationally. The employment status of those at least 15 was that 1,089 (62.5%) people were employed full-time, 282 (16.2%) were part-time, and 51 (2.9%) were unemployed.

Economy 
Edendale has a milk processing plant operated by Fonterra which was originally operated by the Southland Dairy Co-operative. The Edendale milk processing plant was a cheese processing plant but in the 1990s expanded to include milk powder processing. The plant has been expanded several times since and was in 2009 the largest raw milk processing plant in the world.

In the main centre of Edendale, there are several small businesses and operations. These include a butcher, a dairy, a garage, a post office and a primary school.

Transport 
State Highway 1 passes Edendale on its route between Gore and Invercargill. A  bypass west of the dairy factory opened in December 2019, moving State Highway 1 out of the town itself.

The Main South Line portion of the South Island Main Trunk Railway passes through Edendale, having served the town since April 1875. Although passenger services through the town ceased on 10 February 2002, Edendale had been served by some of New Zealand's premier passenger trains – first the South Express, then the South Island Limited, and finally the Southerner.

Edendale was a railway junction for almost eighty years. On 2 October 1882, a branch line from the South Island Main Trunk, the Wyndham Branch, was opened from Edendale to Wyndham on the opposite side of the Mataura River. On 1 May 1890, this line was extended to Glenham. Traffic was light from the beginning, with the extension to Glenham closed on 14 July 1930 and passenger services to Edendale – originally provided by mixed trains and then by RM class Model T Ford railcars – were cancelled on 9 February 1931. By the late 1950s, the line to Wyndham was essentially just an extension of the Edendale railway yard and insufficient quantities of freight meant that the line was closed just weeks before its eightieth anniversary and Edendale ceased to be a railway junction on 9 September 1962.

Education 
Edendale Primary School is the sole school in Edendale, serving approximately  students from Years 1 to 6 (ages 5 to 11).

References

Further reading

Populated places in Southland, New Zealand